Phyllonorycter melanosparta is a moth of the family Gracillariidae. It is known from South Africa, Zimbabwe and western Kenya. The habitat consists of secondary woodland where forest flora intermixes with savannah plants.

The length of the forewings is 2.5–2.8 mm. The forewing ground colour is ferruginous-ochreous with blackish fuscous markings. The hindwings are pale grey with a silver shine and a long pale fuscous fringe. Adults are on wing from late December to late January and from late March to July.

The larvae feed on Desmodium repandum, Flemingia grahamiana, Hylodesmum repandum, Rhynchosia caribaea and Vigna species. They mine the leaves of their host plant. The mine has the form of a moderate, oval, semi-transparent, tentiform mine on the upperside of the leaf.

References

Moths described in 1912
melanosparta
Moths of Africa